Lapp-Nils (Nils Jonsson) (8 May 1804 – 18 April 1870) was a Swedish and Sami musician living in Offerdal, Jämtland, Sweden. He was a violinist and composer of Swedish folk music (Polska).

External links
A polska by Lapp-Nils, played by Rickard Näslin and Göran Andersson
Another polska by Lapp-Nils
The Lapp-Nils Memorial in Offerdal

References 
 En bok om Offerdal, part 3 (1964).

Swedish composers
Swedish male composers
Swedish Sámi musicians
Swedish fiddlers
Male violinists
Swedish Sámi people
Nordic folk musicians
Fiddlers from Sweden